The 2015 Women's EuroHockey Championship II was the 6th edition of the Women's EuroHockey Championship II, a field hockey championship for women. It was held from the 19th until the 27th of July 2015 in Prague, Czech Republic.

Qualified teams

Format
The eight teams were split into two groups of four teams. The top two teams advanced to the semifinals to determine the winner in a knockout system. The bottom two teams played in a new group with the teams they did not play against in the group stage. The last two teams were relegated to the EuroHockey Nations Challenge.

Results
All times were local (UTC+2).

Preliminary round

Pool A

Pool B

Fifth to eighth place classification

Pool C
The points obtained in the preliminary round against the other team are taken over.

First to fourth place classification

Semifinals

Third and fourth place

Final

Statistics

Final standings

Awards

See also
2015 Men's EuroHockey Championship II
2015 Women's EuroHockey Championship III
2015 Women's EuroHockey Nations Championship

References

Women's EuroHockey Championship II
EuroHockey Championship II
Sports competitions in Prague
2010s in Prague
International women's field hockey competitions hosted by the Czech Republic
EuroHockey Championship II
Women 2